Sarmal (also known as Samal and Sumail) is a village in Howmeh Rural District, in the Central District of Bushehr County, Bushehr Province, Iran. At the 2006 census, its population was 268, in 61 families.

References 

Populated places in Bushehr County